The Michigan Legacy Art Park is a  outdoor sculpture park located near Thompsonville, Michigan, on the grounds of Crystal Mountain Resort.

The Michigan Legacy Art Park was founded in 1995 by artist David Barr. It is a non-profit, 501(c)3 organization. Barr was awarded the Governor's Michigan Artist Award in 1988. In his acceptance speech, he told the audience of his desire to create a Michigan Art Park – a place where artists could tell the story of our state in and through the fundamental materials of nature. In his assessment of our state at that time, there was something missing – a place that expresses Michigan's history through the arts. Illustrations or artifacts of that history already existed, but he wanted contemporary artists to bring that history to fresh and vivid life.

Michigan Legacy Art Park inspires awareness, appreciation and passion for Michigan's history, culture and environment through the arts. The mission is primarily fulfilled through an outdoor sculpture collection that expresses Michigan's history and extensive educational opportunities.

Artwork 
Michigan Legacy Art Park includes artwork by the following artists:

Bill Allen
David Barr
Lois Beardslee
Dewey Blocksma
Will Cares
Robert Caskey
Jeremy Davis
Byung Chan Cha
Caroline Court
Sergio De Giusti
Shawn Flagg
David Greenwood
Fritz Horstman
Patricia Innis
Gary Kulak
Michael McGillis
Rebecca Nagle
Sandy Osip
Jim Pallas
David Petrakovitz
Martin Puryear
John Richardson
John Sauvé
Nolan Simon
Lois Teicher
Joe Zajac
Brian Ferriby
Kaz McCue
Pamela Ayres

External links 
 Michigan Legacy Art Park website

References

Museums in Benzie County, Michigan
Art museums and galleries in Michigan
Sculpture gardens, trails and parks in the United States
Parks in Michigan
Art museums established in 1995
1995 establishments in Michigan
Outdoor sculptures in Michigan